The Lesotho Baseball and Softball Association is a body responsible for development and organization of baseball and softball sporting activities in Lesotho. The Association also represents Lesotho on baseball and softball internationally. The LBSA was established by an act of memorandum of association registered with the register of companies at Law Office, the LBSA was founded in 1996 with an executive committee of seven members. The executive has a 4-year term and is elected by the LBSA's member clubs.

Tournament record

All-Africa Games

References

National baseball teams in Africa
Baseball